Éric Durand (born 13 August 1965 in Génelard) is a French former professional footballer who played as a goalkeeper. His nephew, Baptiste, also plays as a goalkeeper.

References

External links
 
 
 

Living people
1965 births
Association football goalkeepers
French footballers
FC Gueugnon players
FC Martigues players
SC Bastia players
Stade Rennais F.C. players
Ligue 1 players
Ligue 2 players
French football managers
SC Bastia managers
Sportspeople from Saône-et-Loire
Footballers from Bourgogne-Franche-Comté